João-Maria Nabais is a Portuguese doctor and writer, noted as an expert in the history of medicine, history of sephardic medical doctors and for his poetry.

Background

Nabais graduated in medicine and surgery from the Faculty of Medicine in the University of Lisbon in 1974. He works as a Hospital Assistant in Paediatrics and takes a post as a member of the Department of Child Psychiatry in Barreiro.

Research interests

The scientific interests of Nabais are: history of health sciences, history of medicine, medical literature and writers. Nabais has published more than a two hundred articles and essays.

He has made numerous presentations on the History of Medicine and Judaism, and has presented papers at national and international meetings.

He has been distinguished in literary contests: António Patrício* Poetry Awards in 1996, 2002 and 2006 by the Portuguese Society of Writers and Artistic Doctors, for the books Poemas, Sons de Urbanidade and O Lugar e o Mito. He received the Merit Cultural Award of the Association of Medical Writers and Journalists of Bucharest, Romania in 2004. He was awarded the Moldarte Award in painting in 1987.

Work in poetry (books)

 1992 – O Silêncio das Palavras
 1996 – Crepúsculo das Noites Breves
 1997 – Instantes e Vivências
 1997 – Poemas
 1998 – Novos Navegantes **
 2000 – Memórias de Amor e Sedução
 2001 – Cidade dos Rios
 2001 – Sons de Urbanidade **
 2002 – Espírito do Vento
 2002 – Monsaraz
 2002 – Palhais
 2002 – Criança, um Tempo de Fuga
 2003 – Interior à Luz
 2005 – O Lugar e o Mito
 2007 – Terra de Húmus e Neblinas

-* António Patrício (1878–1930) was born in Oporto and dies in Macau. He's a well-known Portuguese medical doctor and playwright;
-** with a CD.

References

 https://web.archive.org/web/20071121034006/http://www.vidaslusofonas.pt/joaonabais.htm
 https://web.archive.org/web/20071114042358/http://nescritas.nletras.com/jmnabais/
 Home page
 http://www.triplov.com/hist_fil_ciencia/joao_nabais/humanizacao_medicina.htm
 http://alfarrabio.di.uminho.pt/vercial/nabais.htm
 http://www.triplov.com/hist_fil_ciencia/joao_nabais/index.htm

Portuguese psychiatrists
Portuguese male writers
Portuguese medical historians
Year of birth missing (living people)
Living people
20th-century Portuguese physicians
21st-century Portuguese physicians